Archivista is an open-source document management system which can be deployed as a virtual appliance on any platform (Linux/Windows), in addition, it can be run as embedded box or as cluster solution with multi core functionality.

License 
The ArchivistaBox falls under the GNU General Public License (Version 2). All versions of the ArchivistaBox are published pursuant to the GPL licence, i.e. the open source Edition is 100% the same in its make up as every commercial ArchivistaBox.

Usage 
ArchivistaBox comes with a web-based user interface and is set up with a few mouse clicks whether a single workstation is concerned or a storage cluster. No further software is needed. Document scanners, multi function copiers and internal services can be connected any time. The integrated print server (CUPS), for example, converts spool files automatically into an archive friendly format and sends them to the database where they remain in absolutely audit proof storage.

Building 
The software published under a Free Software license does not include the build scripts or instructions that would allow rebuilding the live CD.

Features 
The ArchivistaBox concept comprises a set of ready-to-use DMS systems which can be put into operation without further ado: all the required features are pre-installed and implementation is kept to an absolute minimum. The advantages:
 Easy installation
 Web-based maintenance
 Modular design
 Scanner integration
 Backup concept
 Compatible with any Archivista solution
 Platform independence
 No laborious filing of individual documents
 Convenient and comfortable searching in entire archives (incl. full text searches)
 Centrally controlled authorisations for users and user groups
 Multi-tenancy archives
 Up to 80 user specific fields
 Automatic OCR
 Barcode and form recognition when scanning documents
 Data upload
 PDF download of every document
 Graphics import from all standard commercial digital cameras
 Internal user administration (with LDAP or HTTP request)
 Optional ArchivistaERP module

External links
 Archivista live DEMO
 Download ISO
 Download Archivista RichClient 2007/III

References 
 
 
 

Document management systems
Free software